Wack or Whack may refer to:

People
 Gerhard Wack (born 1945), German politician
 Henry Wack (1875-1955) attorney; author; apologist for Leopold II's misrule of the Congo Free State
 Pierre Wack (1922–1997) was an unconventional French oil executive who was the first to develop the use of scenario planning in the private sector
 Tierra Whack (born 1995) an American rapper, singer, and songwriter

Arts, entertainment, and media
 WACK, a radio station in Newark, New York
 WACK! Art and the Feminist Revolution, a feminist art exhibition and book
 Whack, a short-lived St. John Publications comic book (1953-54)
 Whack Records
 Wrestling Association of Championship Krushers (WACK), a children's television show
 WACK, a Japanese music production company

Other uses
 Wack, adjective, slang (from "whacked") for oppressive, crazy, stupid, poor quality, unfashionable. As a verb, it means to kill.
 Slash symbol "/", sometimes known as a whack
 Windows App Certification Kit (WACK)

See also
 WAC (disambiguation)
 Whac-A-Mole, an arcade game
 Wacke, or greywacke, a type of sandstone
 Wacker (disambiguation)
 Wak (disambiguation)
 Wank (disambiguation)

German-language surnames